Mohamed Osman may refer to:

 Mohamed Osman (weightlifter) (born 1974), Egyptian weightlifter
 Mohamed Osman, a figure in the 2010 U.S. anti-terrorism investigation Operation Arabian Knight
 Mohamed Osman Irro (died 1978) Somali Army Officer
 Mohamed Osman Elkhosht (born 1964), Egyptian religious philosopher
 Mohamed Osman Mohamud (born 1991), perpetrator of the 2010 Portland car bomb plot
 Mohamed Osman Tahir (born 1984), Sudanese soccer (football) player
 Mohamed Ahmed Osman (born 1920), Egyptian Olympic wrestler
 Mohamed Amin Osman, Somali politician
 Mohamed Hamdi Osman (born 1954), Egyptian Olympic basketball player
 Mohamed Hassan bin Osman (born 1948), Malaysian Olympic sprinter
 Mohamed Sheikh Osman (died 2005), Somali politician